Phthalimidopropiophenone is a chemical intermediate used in the synthesis of cathinone. It has been found to be sold on the illicit market as a controlled substance analogue, but little is currently known about its pharmacology or toxicology.

Phthalimidopropiophenone is not an active stimulant, but is believed to be potentially capable of acting as a prodrug for cathinone when ingested, as similar N-substituted cathinone derivatives have been encountered by law enforcement, and were found to form cathinone in vivo by initial hydroxylation of the pyrrolidine ring followed by subsequent dehydrogenation to the corresponding lactam, then by double dealkylation of the pyrrolidine ring to form the primary amine. It is unclear how rapidly or to what extent this metabolic pathway is followed in humans however, and the phthalimido substituted cathinones encountered may have been produced merely as a more stable form for storage than the relatively unstable primary amine cathinone derivatives.

References 

Stimulants
Ketones
Phthalimides
Cathinones